Winnebago County is a county in the U.S. state of Wisconsin. As of the 2020 census, the population was 171,730. Its county seat is Oshkosh. It was named for the historic Winnebago people, a federally recognized Native American tribe now known as the Ho-Chunk Nation. Chief Oshkosh was a Menominee leader in the area. Winnebago County comprises the Oshkosh-Neenah, WI Metropolitan Statistical Area, which is included in the Appleton-Oshkosh-Neenah, WI Combined Statistical Area.

History
The region was occupied by several Native American tribes in the period of European encounter, including the Sauk, Fox, Menominee, and Ojibwa (known as Chippewa in the US). French traders from what is now Canada had early interaction with them, as did French Jesuit missionaries, who sought to convert them to Catholicism. European and American settlement encroached on their traditional territories, and the United States negotiated treaties in the mid-19th century to keep pushing the Indians to the west.

Winnebago County was created in 1840 by European Americans and organized in 1848. The name Winnebago is of Algonquin origin, with variations used by the Fox and Potowatomi to refer to the Fox River below Lake Winnebago, which sometimes got muddy and full of fish. It means 'people dwelling by the fetid or ill-smelling water', which may also refer to a sulfur spring. The county seat, Oshkosh, was incorporated as a city in 1853, when it already had a population of nearly 2,800.

Chief Oshkosh was the namesake for the county seat. A leader of the Menominee in the region, he was successful in gaining authorization from the federal government for 2500 of his people to remain in Wisconsin, at a time when the government was pushing for their removal west of the Mississippi River.

Geography

Adjacent counties
 Waupaca County - northwest
 Outagamie County - northeast
 Calumet County - east
 Fond du Lac County - south
 Green Lake County - southwest
 Waushara County - west

Major highways

  Interstate 41
  U.S. Highway 10
  U.S. Highway 41
  U.S. Highway 45
  Wisconsin Highway 21
  Wisconsin Highway 26
  Wisconsin Highway 44
  Wisconsin Highway 47
  Wisconsin Highway 76
  Wisconsin Highway 91
  Wisconsin Highway 114
  Wisconsin Highway 116
  Wisconsin Highway 441

Railroads
Canadian National
Wisconsin and Southern Railroad

Buses
GO Transit (Wisconsin)
Valley Transit (Wisconsin)
List of intercity bus stops in Wisconsin

Airports
Wittman Regional Airport (KOSH) serves the county and surrounding communities.

Brennand Airport (79C) in the Town of Clayton is a major recreational aircraft hub year-round.

Commercial airline service for Winnebago County is provided by Appleton International Airport in the neighboring Outagamie County.

Demographics

2020 census
As of the census of 2020, the population was 171,730. The racial makeup of the county was 86.2% White, 3.3% Asian, 3.0% Black or African American, 0.7% Native American, 1.8% from other races, and 5.1% from two or more races. Ethnically, the population was 4.8% Hispanic or Latino of any race.

2000 census
As of the census of 2000, there were 156,763 people, 61,157 households, and 39,568 families residing in the county. The racial makeup of the county was 94.92% White, 1.12% Black or African American, 0.46% Native American, 1.84% Asian, 0.02% Pacific Islander, 0.72% from other races, and 0.92% from two or more races. 1.96% of the population were Hispanic or Latino of any race. 52.4% were of German, 6.2% Irish and 5.7% Polish ancestry. 94.6% spoke English, 2.5% Spanish and 1.0% Hmong as their first language.

There were 61,157 households, out of which 31.00% had children under the age of 18 living with them, 53.00% were married couples living together, 8.30% had a female householder with no husband present, and 35.30% were non-families. 27.60% of all households were made up of individuals, and 9.90% had someone living alone who was 65 years of age or older. The average household size was 2.43 and the average family size was 2.99.

By age, 23.80% of the population was under 18, 11.80% from 18 to 24, 30.40% from 25 to 44, 21.50% from 45 to 64, and 12.50% were 65 or older. The median age was 35 years. For every 100 females there were 99.40 males. For every 100 females age 18 and over, there were 97.80 males.

In 2017, there were 1,833 births, giving a general fertility rate of 56.5 births per 1000 women aged 15–44, the 15th lowest rate out of all 72 Wisconsin counties. Additionally, there were 123 reported induced abortions performed on women of Winnebago County residence in 2017.

Government
Winnebago County is governed by the 36-member Winnebago County Board of Supervisors. Supervisors are elected to the board in a nonpartisan election held the first Tuesday of April in even numbered years and serve two-year terms. The board has several committees. It meets on the third Tuesday of each month at the Winnebago County Courthouse in Oshkosh.

Politics
Winnebago County has become a swing county in recent decades. It has voted for the winning presidential candidate in every election since 1980, except in 1992 when it supported George Bush, and in 2020, when it supported Donald Trump.

Communities

Cities
 Appleton (mostly in Outagamie County and Calumet County)
 Menasha (partly in Calumet County)
 Neenah
 Omro
 Oshkosh (county seat)

Villages
 Fox Crossing
 Winneconne

Towns

 Algoma
 Black Wolf
 Clayton
 Neenah
 Nekimi
 Nepeuskun
 Omro
 Oshkosh
 Poygan
 Rushford
 Utica
 Vinland
 Winchester
 Winneconne
 Wolf River

Census-designated places
 Butte des Morts
 Eureka
 Waukau
 Winchester

Unincorporated communities

 Adella Beach
 Allenville
 Black Wolf
 Black Wolf Point
 Clarks Point
 Decorah Beach
 Elo
 Fairview Beach
 Fisk
 Fitzgerald
 Harbor Springs
 Highland Shore
 Indian Shores
 Island Park
 Larsen
 Lasleys Point
 Leonards Point
 Little Point
 Koro
 Medina Junction
 Melrose Park
 Metz (partial)
 Mikesville
 Nichols Shore Acres
 Oakwood
 Orihula
 Paukotuk
 Piacenza
 Pickett
 Plummer Point
 Point Comfort
 Reighmoor
 Ricker Bay
 Ring
 Rivermoor
 Rush Lake
 Shangri La Point
 Snells
 Sunrise Bay
 Waverly Beach (partial)
 Winnebago
 Zion
 Zittau

Ghost towns/neighborhoods
 Delhi
 Menasha (former)

See also
 National Register of Historic Places listings in Winnebago County, Wisconsin

References

Further reading
 Commemorative Biographical Record of the Fox River Valley Counties of Brown, Outagamie and Winnebago. Chicago: J. H. Beers, 1895.
 Lawson, Publius V. (ed.) History, Winnebago County, Wisconsin: Its Cities, Towns, Resources, People. Chicago: C. F. Cooper, 1908.

External links
 Winnebago County official website
 Winnebago County map from the Wisconsin Department of Transportation

 
1848 establishments in Wisconsin
Populated places established in 1848
Wisconsin placenames of Native American origin